This is a list of episodes for Season 4 of Late Night with Conan O'Brien, which aired from September 17, 1996 to August 22, 1997.

Series overview

Season 4

References

Episodes (season 04)